Makoshika State Park ("ma-KO-sh(ih)kuh" from the Lakota Maco sica, meaning 'bad land' or 'land of bad spirits') is a nature preserve  and public recreation area located on the southeast side of Glendive in Dawson County, Montana. The state park encompasses badlands containing dinosaur fossils and rock from the Hell Creek Formation. It is the largest of Montana's state parks at more than 11,000 acres (45 km2).

Park history
In 1938, the site was proposed as a Badlands National Park by the Glendive Chamber of Commerce. Chamber secretary K. E. Burleigh wrote to federal officials, requesting that they "inspect our proposed bad-lands park, we would be very glad to show it to them and we would appreciate any efforts on your part to have a park established near Glendive, as you know we are very short on scenery and places of interest, and I believe it would be one way to stop tourists in Glendive for a day or two." However, the National Park Service regional office determined that the location was "not of national significance."

The site became a state park in 1939, when Dawson County donated an initial 160 acres to the state. Another 80 acres were donated by the county in 1953. The state acquired additional lands from the U.S. Bureau of Land Management, Dawson County, and private landowners over the course of the following five decades.

Fossil discoveries
Dinosaur fossils discovered in and near the park include examples of Triceratops and Thescelosaurus. A 600-pound juvenile female triceratops skull measuring 5.5 feet long was unearthed in 1991. The skull is displayed in the park's visitor center. In 1997, a fossil thescelosaurus considered to be the largest and most complete skeleton of its kind was found by an expedition led by Jack Horner and Bob Harmon.

Wildlife
Turkey vultures, prairie falcons, and golden eagles make a home in the park.

Activities and amenities
The park features a visitors center with geology and fossil displays, scenic drives, nature trails, campground, archery area, amphitheater, and picnicking facilities. Events include the annual "Buzzard Day" celebration.

References

External links

Makoshika State Park Montana Fish, Wildlife & Parks
Makoshika State Park Trail Map Montana Fish, Wildlife & Parks

Protected areas of Dawson County, Montana
State parks of Montana
Natural history museums in Montana
Museums in Dawson County, Montana
Fossil parks in the United States
Paleontology in Montana
Protected areas established in 1953
1953 establishments in Montana
Badlands of the United States